Martyn Keith was an Australian actor, writer and director who worked during the silent era.

In 1912 he worked as an acting teacher in Lismore, New South Wales where he also performed in plays for his own company.

Select filmography
For the Term of His Natural Life (1908) – actor
'Neath Austral Skies (1913) – actor
For Australia (1915) – writer
The Pioneers (1916) – actor
Murphy of Anzac (1916) – actor 
The Joan of Arc of Loos – assistant director
The Woman in the Case (1916) – assistant director
In the Last Stride (1916) – director
Showgirl's Luck (1931) – writer

Select theatre credits
The Living Dead (1906)
The Little Drummer Boy (1906)
The Queen of Diamonds (1908)
The Brand of Cain (1909)
The Queen of Spies (1910)
Man's Enemy/The Land of Gold (1910)
The Night of the Party (1911)
A Fool There Was (1912)
A Fool There Was (1912)
The Scamps of London (1912)
A Sailor's Sweetheart (1912)
The Burgular (1916)
The Scamps of London (1912)
Capital vs Labor (1916)
A Remittance Man (1916)
The Worst Woman in London (1919)

References

External links
 
Australian theatre credits, AusStage.edu.au; accessed 24 March 2015.

Australian male silent film actors
20th-century Australian male actors
Australian film directors
Year of birth missing
Year of death missing
People from Lismore, New South Wales